The Swedish Trade and Invest Council   represents interests of Sweden in Taiwan in the absence of formal diplomatic relations, functioning as a de facto embassy.  Its counterpart in Sweden is the Taipei Mission in Sweden in Stockholm.

It was established in 1982 as the Swedish Industries' Trade Representative Office.
 
The council is headed by the Representative, Henrik Persson.

See also
 Business Sweden
 List of diplomatic missions in Taiwan
 List of diplomatic missions of Sweden

References

External links

Taipei
1982 establishments in Taiwan
Representative Offices in Taipei
Organizations established in 1982
Sweden–Taiwan relations